Grêmio Desportivo Sãocarlense, is a football club and an amateur football club from São Carlos in São Paulo state, Brazil. It competes in the Campeonato Paulista Segunda Divisão, the fourth tier of the São Paulo state football league.

O Clube (Portuguese for The Club), as is known locally was founded on March 19, 1976. Their football team plays in red, blue and white uniforms.

History
The club were founded on March 19, 1976. They competed in the Campeonato Paulista from 1990 to 1992, and closed their professional football department in 2004.

Achievements
Campeonato Paulista Terceira Divisão (champion and access for Second division): 1989

Stadium

Grêmio Desportivo Sãocarlense play their matches at Estádio Luisão located in downtown São Carlos, inaugurated in 1968. The stadium has a maximum capacity of 10,000 people.

Trivia
The club's mascot is a wolf.
Grêmio Desportivo Sãocarlense is the only São Carlos's club to reach amateur in 2009.

References

Association football clubs established in 1976
Football clubs in São Paulo (state)
São Carlos
1976 establishments in Brazil